Wu Mengchang (1911 - 6 October 2006) was a Chinese translator and author who won the Lu Xun Literary Prize in 1995, a prestigious literature award in China.
 
He was most notable for being one of the main translators into Chinese of the works of the Russian novelist Maxim Gorky.

Biography
Wu was born in Xinning County, Guangdong in 1911. He joined the China League of Life-Wing Writers in 1932.

He graduated from Fudan University in 1935, where he majored in foreign language and literature.

Wu started to publish works in 1936.

In 1952, Wu joined the China Writers Association.

Wu died in Beijing on October 6, 2006.

Works
 The Complete Works of Gorky (Maxim Gorky)
 The Mysteries of Paris (Eugene Sue)
 Americans in Japan
 Czechoslovakia (Medvedev)

Awards
 Lu Xun Literary Prize (1995)
 Chinese Translation Association – Senior Translator (2004)

Personal life
He had a son, Wu Yongguang.

References

1911 births
2006 deaths
Writers from Jiangmen
Fudan University alumni
People's Republic of China translators
Russian–Chinese translators
20th-century Chinese translators
21st-century Chinese translators
20th-century novelists
Chinese male novelists
20th-century Chinese male writers
Republic of China translators
People from Taishan, Guangdong